Squier is a surname. Notable people with the surname include:

 Billy Squier (born 1950), American rock musician
 Carl Browne Squier (1893–1967), American World War I aviation pioneer
 Ephraim George Squier (1821–1888), American archaeologist
 George Owen Squier (1863–1934), American inventor
 Ken Squier (born 1935), American sportscaster and motorsports editor
 Mark Squier, American political consultant
 J. Bentley Squier, MD, FACS, (1873-1948) was the 16th President of the American College of Surgeons and Urologist-in-Chief at Columbia-Presbyterian Hospital from 1928-1939